Sakhanka is a village in Novoazovsk Raion (district) in Donetsk Oblast of eastern Ukraine, at 126 km south from the centre of Donetsk city; the SE part of the village borders with the Sea of Azov.

During the War in Donbass pro-Russian forces took the settlement under their control.

Demographics
Native language as of the Ukrainian Census of 2001:
Ukrainian — 58.28%
Russian — 41.54%

References

External links
 Weather forecast for Sakhanka

Villages in Kalmiuske Raion